The finals and the qualifying heats of the Women's 200 metres Freestyle event at the 1997 FINA Short Course World Championships were held on the second day of the competition, on Friday 1997-04-18 in Gothenburg, Sweden.

Finals

See also
1996 Women's Olympic Games 200 m Freestyle
1997 Women's European LC Championships 200 m Freestyle

References
 Results

F
1997 in women's swimming